Head Office is a 1985 American satirical black comedy film, produced by HBO Pictures in association with Silver Screen Partners.  It stars Judge Reinhold, Eddie Albert, Lori-Nan Engler, Jane Seymour, Richard Masur, Michael O'Donoghue, Ron Frazier, and Merritt Butrick and was directed and written by Ken Finkleman. It is also the first film to be composed by James Newton Howard.

Plot
Jack Issel (Judge Reinhold) is a natural-born slacker who has just graduated from business school and joined I.N.C., a large American corporation based in Chicago.  On his trip up the corporate ladder, he sees the dirty underside of the corporate world and how it corrupts people.  His two mentors, the stuffy and buttoned up chief financial officer Scott Dantley (Michael O'Donoghue) and the chief operating officer Bob Nixon (Ron Frazier) show him first-hand how to cheat and blackmail one's way to the top. Jack is further aided by his personnel officer Max Landsberger (Richard Masur) who tells Jack that money and power come before people in the corporate world. Jack's supervisor and the public relations vice president, Jane Caldwell (Jane Seymour), also tells Jack exactly the same thing as Jack learns that Jane is a shady vixen who is hell-bent on sleeping her way to the top by seducing every man she meets to get ahead in what she sees as a man's world.

Unsure of his abilities, and often incompetent, Jack can't figure out why he keeps getting promoted.  Could it have something to do with his father (George Coe) being an influential (but corrupt) Senator?

Among the numerous subplots, Jack meets and falls in love with a young woman named Rachel (Lori-Nan Engler), who turns out to be the radical, left-wing daughter of the ruthless chairman of the board and CEO, Pete Helmes (Eddie Albert), who is revealed to be promoting Jack so he can gain Jack's father, Senator Issel's support to close down a textile plant in a small upstate town called Allenville, and move it into the Latin American country of San Marcos for company self-interest. Jack spends the rest of the movie trying to stop I.N.C. from closing down the plant, and trying to win Rachel's heart to prove that he can be a good businessman.

This film has a strong supporting cast in the many interrelated and unrelated subplots who include such established stars as Danny DeVito, an inside trader named Frank Stedman, and Rick Moranis, as a screaming burnout executive Howard Gross, both of whom die 20 minutes into the film, the former committing suicide by jumping out of a window into a fountain, and the latter dying of a heart attack. Other subplots include an executive named Mike Hoover (Wallace Shawn), another burnout who learns he is dying from an unknown terminal illness and everyone, including his coke-sniffing best friend Al Kennedy (Bruce Wagner), trying to maneuver into his job as head of the Latin American division. John Hudson (Merritt Butrick) is also a recent recruit at I.N.C. and one of Jack Issel's classmates who resorts to trickery to get ahead in the business. Boxing promoter Don King makes a cameo appearance as a I.N.C. executive.

Midway through the film, most of the subplots end without a resolution, and the rest of the film focuses entirely on Jack and Rachel. Within a week of his employment, the further promoted Jack, with Max in tow, travel upstate to the town of Allenville to give a press conference on the closing of the textile plant where Rachel has organized a huge protest of thousands of workers and townspeople protesting the closing of the plant. The mob of townspeople attack and destroy Jack and Max's limousine, much to the chagrin of the company limo driver, Sal (Don Novello). At the same time, to impress Rachel, rather than tell a fabricated public relations story about the closing of the plant, Jack tells the truth to the reporters about I.N.C. reasons which are entirely of self-interest, while both the enraged Helmes and Jack's father watch the event on their TV sets. This does win over Rachel's affections and that night, she and Jack spend the night together.

The following morning, while Helmes decides to fire Jack, he sees that Jack's actions have drawn nationwide media attention whom hail Jack Issel as an honest businessman. Helmes changes his mind about firing Jack and invites him to his house that weekend, where Jack runs into Rachel again and finally learns that she is Helmes' daughter. Helmes tries to win over Jack's loyalty to I.N.C. by inviting him to a dinner reception at the council offices of a fictitious Latin American country of San Marcos where Jack is expected to give a $2 million bribe to a political rival of the San Marcos dictator General Sepulveda (John Kapelos) as another I.N.C. ploy to win the support of the dictatorship government for further business purposes.

At the reception, Jack sneaks Rachel into the building where they finally learn the truth about Helmes plans for Jack, as well as his plans for I.N.C.'s business with the country of San Marcos. Stealing the suitcase with the $2 million cash-bribe money, Jack and Rachel flee from the building security forces in a climatic chase and escape from the building and expose I.N.C.'s plans to the press. As a result, the textile plant in Allenville is saved, Pete Helmes is forced to resign from I.N.C. in disgrace, and Jack and Rachel both inherit the majority of I.N.C. stockholder shares.

The final scene has Jack, now the new chairman of the board at I.N.C., traveling in Pete Helmes' helicopter, to the offices with Sal as his pilot.

Cast

Location
The film was largely filmed in Toronto, Ontario, part of a growing trend in the late 1970s and throughout the 1980s of making American films there.  Scenes were also filmed in nearby Oshawa, Ontario at the Parkwood Mansion, which doubled as the mansion residence of Pete Helmes.

Reception

Critical response

Janet Maslin of The New York Times wrote in her review: "Head Office, which opened yesterday at the UA Twin and other theaters, has a droll tone that sets it well above comedy's lowest common denominator. But it also has a bloodlessness that keeps it from being funny very often. Ken Finkleman, the film's writer and director, has assembled an interesting cast and struck a note that might have been timely; though corporate satire has been out of vogue for a while, it's ready for a revival. But while Head Office has its moments, it winds up much too understated to have a cutting edge."

Reinhold later said the film had "a good script, but things didn't work out at the old box office."

Release
Head Office was released in theaters on December 29, 1985. The film was released on DVD on April 6, 2010, by HBO Home Entertainment. HBO re-released Head Office on DVD on April 2, 2012.

References

External links
 
 
 

1980s black comedy films
1985 films
American business films
American black comedy films
American satirical films
Films scored by James Newton Howard
Films scored by Alan Howarth (composer)
Films about businesspeople
TriStar Pictures films
Workplace comedy films
Films produced by Debra Hill
Films with screenplays by Ken Finkleman
Films directed by Ken Finkleman
1985 comedy films
1980s English-language films
1980s American films